Liu Zhenmin (born August 1955) is a Chinese diplomat who served as the Under-Secretary-General for the United Nations Department of Economic and Social Affairs from 2017 to 2022. He was appointed to the position effective on 26 July 2017. Previously he had served as Vice-Minister for Foreign Affairs of China after a thirty-year career in the Ministry of Foreign Affairs of the People's Republic of China.

Education and early career 
Liu holds a Master of Laws from the Law School of Peking University.

Selected bibliography 

 Liu Zhenmin (24 April 2018) "Time for a Global Financial Makeover", Project Syndicate.

References

External links
 https://www.un.org/development/desa/statements/usg-liu.html

1955 births
Living people
Chinese diplomats
Under-Secretaries-General of the United Nations
Vice-ministers of the Ministry of Foreign Affairs of the People's Republic of China
Peking University alumni
Chinese officials of the United Nations